Louise Janet Kaplan, o.s. Miller, (18 November 1929, New York City – 9 January 2012, New York) was an American psychologist and psychoanalyst best known for her research into sexual perversion and fetishism. Kaplan authored seven books including the 1991 book, Female Perversions: The Temptations of Emma Bovary which was made into the 1996 film Female Perversions starring Tilda Swinton.

Publications
 Oneness and Separateness: From Infant to Individual, 1978
 Adolescence: The Farewell to Childhood, 1984
 The Family Romance of the Impostor-Poet Thomas Chatterton, 1987
 Female Perversions: The Temptations of Emma Bovary, 1991
 No Voice Is Ever Wholly Lost, 1995
 Cultures of Fetishism, 2006

Death
Kaplan died of pancreatic cancer on Monday, January 9, 2012, at Beth Israel Hospital.

References

20th-century American psychologists
American psychoanalysts
Jewish psychoanalysts
1929 births
2012 deaths
Brooklyn College alumni